Bertil Ström (born 3 January 1953) is a Swedish judoka. He competed in the men's middleweight event at the 1980 Summer Olympics.

References

1953 births
Living people
Swedish male judoka
Olympic judoka of Sweden
Judoka at the 1980 Summer Olympics
Sportspeople from Helsingborg
20th-century Swedish people